Mark Boyle may refer to:

 Mark Boyle (artist) (1934–2005), Scottish artist
 Mark Boyle (Moneyless Man) (born 1979), Irish activist and writer
 Mark Boyle (snooker player) (born 1981), Scottish snooker player
 Mark A. Boyle, American choral conductor, see Compline Choir